Tamolwan Khetkhuan (born 9 June 1997) is a Thai table tennis player. Her highest career ITTF ranking was 99.

References

1997 births
Living people
Tamolwan Khetkhuan
Table tennis players at the 2014 Asian Games
Table tennis players at the 2018 Asian Games
Tamolwan Khetkhuan
Tamolwan Khetkhuan
Southeast Asian Games medalists in table tennis
Tamolwan Khetkhuan